Sebastiano Pinna (born 9 April 1971) is a retired Italian football midfielder.

References

1971 births
Living people
Italian footballers
S.E.F. Torres 1903 players
Cagliari Calcio players
Association football midfielders
Serie B players